William Wright (W. W.) Heard (April 28, 1853 - May 31, 1926) was the 32nd Governor of Louisiana from 1900 to 1904. His governorship saw the start of the Louisiana's oil and gas industry.

Early life
Heard was educated in a local school in his native Union Parish. He long remembered the challenges of educating children in rural areas. Heard worked to create the first Louisiana State Board of Education.

On December 3, 1878, Heard married the former Isbella E. Manning. The couple had seventeen children, including Louisiana Belle, Manning, William Wright Heard, Jr., and Alma, who died as a toddler.

Public service
In 1884, Heard was elected to the Louisiana House of Representatives from Union Parish in north Louisiana, based about Farmerville. After a single four-year term, he was elected in 1888 to the Louisiana State Senate for a four-year term. In 1892, Heard was elected as Louisiana state auditor, a position that he held for two terms of eight years. The auditor's position is no longer elected.

As a protégé of the outgoing governor, Murphy James Foster, Sr., Heard was controversially hand-picked by Foster to succeed him at the Democratic state convention of 1900 at a time before Louisiana held primary elections. Heard was a member of the Democratic Party, but he had Populist tendencies and was a supporter of the expanded coinage of silver.

At the general election, he defeated two Republicans running on separate tickets, both of whom received less than 22 percent of the vote following the mass-scale disenfranchisement of African American voters via Jim Crow laws. Reflecting this was the dramatic decline in voting, from a post-Reconstruction high in the 1896 statewide election of over 203,000 votes down to only 76,000 by 1900. Not until 1940 would more than 200,000 voters participate in a general election for governor. This 1900 election also marked the last time Republicans would have any real presence in the legislature until the 1960s.

Heard was inaugurated governor on May 8, 1900, and held this office until May 10, 1904. At the time governors in Louisiana could not succeed themselves. His term was fairly low-key compared to other colorful and dynamic personalities that held that office and he was considered to be a "bureaucratic" governor. His lieutenant governor was Albert Estopinal, a planter and outgoing state senator from St. Bernard Parish. As state banking commissioner, Heard named Lee Emmett Thomas, like Heard a native of Union Parish. Thomas was thereafter the mayor of Shreveport, Louisiana from 1922 to 1930 and had also served as Speaker of the Louisiana House of Representative from 1912 to 1916.

Governor Heard appointed former Attorney General Milton Joseph Cunningham, a lawyer from both Natchitoches and New Orleans, to a four-year term as the public administrator of Orleans Parish.

Heard carried on a correspondence with a young state representative, Harry D. Wilson of Tangipahoa Parish, who in 1916 was elected to the first of eight terms as the Louisiana Commissioner of Agriculture and Forestry. Wilson petitioned Heard to permit the establishment of the town of Independence, which had been settled by Wilson's father, a physician, in the 1850s. The town was reduced in area before it was established in 1912, by which time Heard had been out of office for eight years. Wilson himself was the father of Justin E. Wilson, the Louisiana Cajun humorist and chef.

It was during Heard's term that the discovery of oil was made by W. Scott Heywood and Associates of what is now Jeff Davis Parish, then part of Calcasieu Parish. This company completed Jennings Oil Company Number 1, Jules Clement, at Evangeline on September 21, 1901. This was the start of the vital Louisiana oil and gas industry. Couple the wealth of this industry with the rise of forestry and the earlier discovery of Sulfur, and the state was sent on a new wave of economic growth. Eventually, Louisiana became one of the major American producers of oil and natural gas in addition to a center of petroleum refining and petrochemicals manufacturing, as the state remains to this day, augmented by offshore drilling.

The Louisiana Revised Statutes specify that the governor shall determine the design of the official state seal. To standardize a design for the seal, Governor Heard instructed the Secretary of State in 1902 to use a seal described as:
"A Pelican, with its head turned to the left, in nest with three young; the Pelican, following the tradition in act of tearing its breast to feed its young; around the edge of the seal to be inscribed 'State of Louisiana'. Over head of the Pelican to be inscribed 'Union, Justice', and under the Pelican to be inscribed 'Confidence'."
The description of the seal included the motto, which Gov. William Heard had chosen: Union, Justice, Confidence. This seal was adopted on April 30, 1902.

Heard achieved the formation of the state prison system, which eliminated privately contracted prisons. He was also instrumental in forming the State Department of Pest Control, thus trying to control the hated boll weevil, which plagued the cotton plants.

Serving in public office most of his early life, Heard became a banker in New Orleans after his single term as governor. He died in New Orleans and is interred there at Metairie Cemetery.

Lineage
William Wright Heard, like a gubernatorial successor, Ruffin Pleasant, was born near the rural community of Shiloh in Union Parish north of Ruston. He was the son of Stephen Southard Heard and Mary Ann Wright. They are interred at Fellowship Baptist Church Cemetery in Dubach along with other allied members of the Heard family. Coming from a long lineage of southern pioneers, his ancestors included John Stovall, Owen Griffin, John Anderson and Charles Heard, all Revolutionary War patriots. Stephen Heard RS, one of the first governors of Georgia, was also from this noble line. As with most members of his family, Heard was Baptist.

References

External links 
State of Louisiana - Biography
Cemetery Memorial by La-Cemeteries

1853 births
1926 deaths
American bankers
Democratic Party governors of Louisiana
Democratic Party members of the Louisiana House of Representatives
Democratic Party Louisiana state senators
Businesspeople from New Orleans
People from Union Parish, Louisiana
Politicians from New Orleans
Burials at Metairie Cemetery